The right to repair refers to proposed government legislation to forbid manufacturers to impose barriers that deny consumers the ability to repair and modify their own consumer products (e.g. electronic, automotive devices or farm vehicles such as tractors). Such barriers require consumers to use only the manufacturer's offered services by restricting access to tools and components, and include software barriers that hinder independent repair or modification. Right to repair may also refer to the movement of citizens putting pressure on their governments to create enabling laws.

These obstacles often lead to higher consumer costs or drive consumers to replace devices instead of repairing them.  While the global community is concerned over the growing volume of the waste stream (especially electronic components), the primary debate over the right to repair has been centered on the United States and within the European Union.

Definition 
Right to repair refers to the concept of allowing end users, business users as well as consumers, of technical, electronic or automotive devices to freely repair these products in case of mechanical or technical failure. Four requirements are of particular importance:

 the device should be constructed and designed in a manner that allows repairs to be made easily;
 end users and independent repair providers should be able to access original spare parts and necessary tools (software as well as physical tools) at fair market conditions;
 repairs should by design be possible and not hindered by software programming;
 the repairability of a device should be clearly communicated by the manufacturer.

While initially driven majorly by automotive consumers protection agencies and the automotive after sales service industry, the discussion of establishing a right to repair for any kind of industrially produced device gained traction as consumer electronics such as smartphones and computers became universally available and used, alongside advanced computerized integration in farming equipment. The movement was also backed by climate change activists, since this approach would reduce e-waste.

The goals of the right to repair are to favor repair instead of replacement and make such repairs more affordable leading to a more sustainable economy and reduction in electronic waste.
By 2021 many countries and economic unions have proposed right to repair legislation for various industries such as electronics or the automotive sector.

Environmental impact of a lack of repairability

Electronic devices 

One of the factors which exacerbate the e-waste problem is the short lifetime of many electrical and electronic goods.  There are two drivers (in particular) for this trend.  On the one hand, consumer demand for low cost products militates against product quality and results in short product lifetimes.  On the other, manufacturers in some sectors encourage a regular upgrade cycle, and may even enforce it though restricted availability of spare parts, service manuals and software updates, or through planned obsolescence.

Up to 95% of raw materials used to produce electronic devices can be recycled, while the vast majority of newly produced devices use little to none, to save cost.  In Italy for example, 52% of the population own one or more unused electronic devices due to obsolescence or unrepaired damage or failures.  Easier repair would reintroduce a larger share of these devices to the second hand market thus reducing the production of new devices and the consequent raw material consumption and emissions.

Automotive sector and vehicles

Emission reduction by fleet replacement 
While a right to repair almost always favors the consumer, from an environmental point of view reuse in the automotive industry can not in all cases be favored over old ones: continuous regulation in Europe and the US has caused average emissions of cars during usage to drop significantly. While the production of a car produces significant emissions, the overall lifetime emissions are significantly lower given the reduction during the use of the car. In 2009 the German government incentivized consumers and businesses to replace old cars with new ones. During the campaign more than 400.000 cars with an average age of 14.4 years were replaced with current models reducing the emissions of the national fleet by 1% per year and a notable reduction in particle and oxide emission.

Repair in the United States

Obsolescence and restricting repairs (1920-1950) 

The notion that continuous changes to products creates continuous demand for substitution of a product's older generation was brought up on large scale by General Motors executive Alfred P. Sloan, who suggested that annual changes to their models will fuel demand of customers to replace their old cars with newer ones.  Though the main competitor Ford, based on the principles of its founder Henry Ford, preferred simple and easy to replace parts, often interchangeable across models, GM felt not limited by considerations regarding the customer's ability to repair vehicles and even favored designs of lower quality to adjust rapidly to annual changes in consumer demands in the hope of selling more cars. Eventually this strategy allowed GM to overtake Ford as biggest American  automaker. As a result of the success of GM, the concept of purposely changing designs and as a consequence also parts within the annual variants of a product became a widely adopted strategy among many different industries in the American economy and was also adopted by Ford.

While GM and Ford initially differed significantly on their approach of interchangeability of components and ease of repair, the car industry as a whole was at the forefront of establishing the concept of certified repair: Starting from the 1910s and '20s Ford made significant effort to establish certified dealerships and service networks to drive customers towards Ford produced parts instead of selecting independent repair shops and often non genuine after sales parts to repair cars.  Ford also aggressively pushed for standardized pricing among the certified repair shops making flat fees mandatory even for different repairs.  The combination of annual updates to the cars and their components made it much more difficult for independent repair shops to maintain a stock of parts and clearly favored authorized dealerships. 

This approach undermined independent repair from different angles: given frequent model upgrades, consumers were psychologically pushed towards the purchase of new cars while the maintenance of old cars and needed repairs were made less attractive by pushing consumers into authorized repair networks that were often more costly than independent repairs given that a less globalized economy of the 19th century spare parts were much harder to produce and / or acquire for independent repair shops. Effectively, legal precedent establishing the right to repair was undermined. This constituted a significant change over the period of the great depression in which consumers grew accustomed to self repair given economical constraints.

In fact, not only did manufacturers undermine the possibility of repair by technical means, they also frequently attacked companies in courts that tried to refurbish components: in 1938 Champion Spark Plug, a company that itself built its success on copying foreign spark plug designs to be manufactured and subsequently sold to Buick, sued the company Reich. Reich was refurbishing spark plugs and sold them as reconditioned. While it was already established by legal precedent in the 19th century that the owner of a good has the right to repair even patented goods, the subsequent court ruling made clear that, neither implicit nor explicit, the good could be sold as identical to the new original good establishing clear boundaries between used (or repaired) goods and new goods.

Restricting access to parts (1950s-2000s) 
By 1956 many manufacturers across various industries had adopted a strategy similar to GM for their products, but it was IBM's dominant position in the computer mainframe market that caused the first implicit right to repair: IBM, back then the leading supplier for information technology to the US government and large corporations, was sued by the Department of Justice for uncompetitive behavior undermining the second hand market by not allowing clients to own, but only to lease their products. Given that all equipment had to be returned to IBM after expiration of leasing agreements IBM was technically the sole owner of the machines. Access to IBM software and hardware was always bundled effectively keeping other "software" companies away from their hardware and not allowing customers to run IBM logic on non IBM machines. Given the near monopolistic market position of IBM the U.S. Department of Justice successfully pursued a consent decree forcing IBM not only to sell all products at conditions that would not disadvantage purchasing  over leasing them, but also to spin off the service division and provide parts, maintenance instructions and tools at identical commercial conditions to independent repair companies as to their own service division assuring that a second hand market and after sales market could be created. While this constituted the first real right to repair, the grounds for the decision were based on anti trust motives and not applicable on future electronics manufacturers as the entrance of domestic competitors such as HP and Asian manufacturers by introducing the so-called IBM compatible devices established a wide quantity of different players in the market. As a consequence the consent decree was abolished in the courts in 1997.

In the meantime lower and higher courts continued to reinforce the perspective that the ownership of a product came together with clear rights of the repair and modification of such product: in 1961 the U.S. Supreme Court clearly ruled in the case of Aro Manufacturing Co. v. Convertible Top Replacement Co. that even patented products can be repaired without infringing the rights of the patent owner. While previous instances used rather complex processes to weight if a product was reconstructed or repaired, the Supreme Court clearly stated that, as long as a product can be recognized as a repaired item and not as a new product, repair was admissible.

With IBM was under significant pressure by the consent decree and the legal situation tilting in favor of repair, other manufacturers across industries took different turns and to interfere with unauthorized repairs electronically. Apple, which rose quickly to become one of the largest computer manufacturers, sold the first computers with circuit board descriptions, easy to swap components and clear repair instructions. Driven by technological advancements all kinds of products such as cars, lawn mowers, even coffee machines, had more and more electronic components by design, much harder to replace than mechanical components. While in the fifties electronics in a car were limited to simple circuits to start engines and to power simple components such as air conditioning or central locking, the sixties saw an increasing amount of complex semiconductors to be used in cars starting with engine controls such as fuel ignition. As part of this process of mixing electronic components with mechanics, the share of electronic components in the total bill of material for a car rose from 5% in the 1970s to over 22% in 2000. While previously car repair was a process of analysing and substituting mechanical components, the increasing hybridization of cars brought the need of special tools that could often only be accessed by manufacturer authorized repair services.

1975 saw the introduction of the Magnuson–Moss Warranty Act governing standards for warranties given on products: while the law did not stipulate an obligation for a manufacturer to grant warranty with every product sold to consumers, it did define minimum standards for such warranty if the supplier decided to grant it. The legislative history indicates that the purpose of the act is to make warranties on consumer products more readily understood and enforceable and to provide the Federal Trade Commission with means to better protect consumers. While the Magnusson-Moss Warranty Act defined terms such as repair within warranty, it did not obligate manufacturers to open up their products to easy repair.

In addition, copyright became a front on the limitation of repairability: as written software code gave the creator of the code the only authority to decide if derivatives are to be created of the same code. One of the more notable examples was the lawsuit MAI Systems Corp. v. Peak Computer, Inc. in which Peak Computer, Inc. by was sued for making unauthorized copies of the MAI operating system to repair MAI produced computer systems. While MAI won the lawsuit, the legislative chambers implemented exceptions to the Digital Millennium Copyright Act in 1998 explicitly allowing such copies for the purpose of repairing a machine. While this legislation therefor fixed the aspect of installing protected software for the purpose of maintenance and repair, it did not foresee the significant amount of software locks for the years to come.

The field of printer ink cartridges became of particular interest to the public: with the introduction of computers into almost every household also printers became available for practically everyone. Printer manufacturers saw the sales of ink cartridge as a lucrative business model in fact often charging more for the ink then for the printer itself. To prevent refilling of empty cartridges, most manufacturers started to place microchips counting fill levels and usage on the cartridge rendering refills impossible or at least harder. Many of this systems worked at the disadvantage of end users declaring cartridges incorrectly as empty or blocking the printer from functioning properly. A practice that was found illegal in numerous lawsuits. In addition to software locks, the printer industry tried unsuccessfully to sue against practices such as reproduction and refilling of cartridges, a practice confirmed to be legal by the Supreme Court in 2017.

Rise and activism and legislative activity (2000-2020) 

With the beginning of the 2000s, the automotive industry came under scrutiny again: the first proposal of a right to repair bill for the automotive sector was introduced by Joe Barton and Edolphus Towns to end the "unfair monopoly" of car manufacturers maintaining control over repair information that could result in independent shops turning away car owners due to lack of information. The proposal was struck down by significant lobbying efforts by the automotive industry but nevertheless introduced progress in form of a voluntary agreement obligating manufacturers to provide spare parts and diagnostics to independent repair companies. While the voluntary agreement surely was an improvement, studies later found that access to spare parts and car diagnostics continued to remain problematic for independent repair services. In fact, a study conducted by the Terrance Group found that around 59% of independent repair services continued to struggle to get access to diagnostic tools and parts from manufacturers.

Besides the setbacks, a continuous trend towards right to repair in automotive as well as other industries started to get traction in the legislative branch, with an increasing amount of legal proposals and court decisions: 

The first successful implementation of a right to repair came when Massachusetts passed the United States' first right to repair law for the automotive sector in 2012, which required automobile manufacturers to sell the same service materials and diagnostics directly to consumers or to independent mechanics as they used to provide exclusively to their dealerships. The Massachusetts statute was the first to pass among several states, such as New Jersey, which had also passed a similar bill through their Assembly. Facing the potential of a variety of slightly different requirements, major automobile trade organizations signed a Memorandum of Understanding in January 2014 using the Massachusetts' law as the basis of their agreement for all 50 states starting in the 2018 automotive year.  A similar agreement was reached by the Commercial Vehicle Solutions Network to apply to over-the-road trucks.

In 2013, major grassroots movements started to form: the Digital Right to Repair Coalition, also known as the Repair Association using the website repair.org, was founded and has led nearly all state legislative efforts in the United States influencing the formation of similarly focused advocacy groups around the world. The coalition is a 501(c)(6) trade association incorporated in New Jersey and funded entirely by membership dues. The goal of the coalition is to support the aftermarket for technology products through advocating for repair-friendly laws, standards, regulations and policies.  As such, its members are engaged in repairs, resale, refurbishment, reconfiguration and recycling regardless of industry.

The coalition filed their first legislative action in South Dakota in January 2014 as SB.136 (Latterell).  Four states followed in 2015 - New York (S.3998 Boyle/A.6068 Morelle), Minnesota (SF 873 Osmek/ HF 1048 Hertaus), Massachusetts (H.3383 Cronin/S. Kennedy), and Nebraska (LB 1072 Haar).  Tennessee (SB888/H1382 Jernigan) and Wyoming (HB 0091 Hunt) were added in 2016. The following year - 2017 - new bills were filed in North Carolina (HB663 Richardson), Kansas (HB2122 Barker), Illinois (HB3030 Harris), Iowa (HF556 and SF2028), Missouri (HB1178 McCreery), New Hampshire (HB1733 Luneau) and New Jersey (A4934 Moriarty). 2018 added Oklahoma, Hawaii, Georgia, Virginia, Vermont and Washington. 2019  added Oregon, Nevada, Indiana and Montana. 2020 was shortened by the Pandemic but added Maine, Idaho, Alabama, Maryland, Pennsylvania and Colorado.

In December 2022, New York Governor Kathy Hochul signed into law the Digital Fair Repair Act a year after it passed the state senate. The law established the right of consumers and independent repairers to get manuals, diagrams, and original parts from manufacturers, although The Verge, Engadget, and Ars Technica noted the bill was made less vigorous by way of last minute changes that provided exceptions to original equipment manufacturers. It will go into effect in July 2023.

Manufacturers respond

Initial rejections 
Manufacturers found new ways to lock devices practically circumventing owners rights to repair: practices like part pairing (components of a device are serialized and can not be swapped against others), became increasingly popular among manufacturers.  Even common repairs such as the replacement of a smartphone display caused malfunctions due to locks implemented in the software.  Apple, the manufacturer of the iPhone for example started to gradually restrict the swap of displays starting with warning messages on older devices down to straight forward removing security features such as Face ID if the display was swapped by other than a manufacturer authorized repair facility.  This trend was begun in the agricultural sector by tractor manufacturer John Deere, and became widespread in consumer electronics in the 2010s.

In contrast to manufacturers locking down their devices, new manufacturers appeared on the market, adopting the right to repair as a core philosophy.  Companies such as Framework Computer and Fairphone produced devices that are modular and easy to repair.  In addition, some companies are even releasing 3D printable models of replacement parts, allowing consumers to print the parts locally, reducing the need for storage and shipping.

Reversals 
In 2022, Apple started enabling customers to repair batteries and screens. In January 2023, John Deere reversed course, signing a memorandum of understanding with the American Farm Bureau Federation agreeing that American farmers had the right to repair their own equipment.

Legal

United States 
In the United States the right to repair found application in federal and state law:
 The Magnuson–Moss Warranty Act; a United States federal law governing warranties on consumer products
 United States federal and state legislation concerning Motor Vehicle Owners' Rights to Repair
 Exception 13 of 37 CFR § 201.40 allowing farmers to modify tractor software for maintenance

In other countries and regions 
 In the United Kingdom, a consumer's right to repair or replacement of defective goods under the Consumer Rights Act 2015

Remedies after 2020

Legislative focus for state legislation 
Legislation intended to use the power of general business law in states for general repair of devices including a digital electronic part is based on the Automotive MOU from 2014.  Template legislation avoided any requirements to change the format of documentation, the method of delivery of existing parts, tools, diagnostics or information.  It does not require disclosing any trade secrets.   Manufacturers are permitted to charge fair and reasonable prices for physical parts and tools, and are limited in their charges for information that is already posted online.

In addition to the work of the coalition - various individuals have started ballot initiatives.   A ballot initiative was filed in Missouri and certified for inclusion on the 2022 ballot.  In March 2021, Louis Rossmann started a crowdfunding campaign to raise $6 million using the GoFundMe platform in order to start a direct ballot initiative to protect consumer right to repair in the Commonwealth of Massachusetts, citing previous similar successes in the automotive industry.

National legislation 
The Federal Trade Commission (FTC) issued a report "Nixing the Fix" in May 2021 to Congress, outlining issues around corporations' policies that limit repairs on consumer goods that it considered in violation of trade laws, and outlined steps that could be done to better enforce this. This included self-regulation by the industries involved, as well as expansion of existing laws such as the Magnuson-Moss Warranty Act or new laws to give the FTC better enforcement to protect consumers from overzealous repair restrictions. On July 9, 2021, President Joe Biden signed Executive Order 14036, "Promoting Competition in the American Economy", a sweeping array of initiatives across the executive branch. Among them included instructions to the FTC to craft rules to prevent manufacturers from preventing repairs performed by owners or independent repair shops. About two weeks after the EO was issued, the FTC made a unanimous vote to enforce the right to repair as policy and will look to take action against companies that limit the type of repair work that can be done at independent repair shops.

Corporate allowances
John Deere & Co. announced in January 2023 that it will now allow consumers of its agricultural equipment to repair on their own or at independent repair shops in the U.S. Consumers and independent repair centers would still be bound against divulging certain trade secrets, and cannot tamper or override emission control settings, but other free to repair as they see fit.

See also
Do it yourself
Decompilation
Bugfix
Reverse engineering
Open source
Open design
Repair Café
Tool library
Unofficial patch

References

External links 
 United States Department of Justice: United States' Memorandum in Support of Joint Motion to Modify the 1956 Final Judgment and Response to Public Comments: U.S. v. International Business Machines Corporation
 United States District Court: Final Judgement on Civil Action No. 72-344 United States vs. International Business Machines Corporations

Consumer protection
Intellectual property law
Maintenance